The Cambridge Biomedical Campus is the largest centre of medical research and health science in Europe. The site is located at the southern end of Hills Road in Cambridge, England. 

Over 20,000 people work at the site, which is home to Cambridge University Hospitals NHS Foundation Trust, Royal Papworth Hospital NHS Foundation Trust, AstraZeneca's headquarters, Abcam, the Wellcome Trust, Cancer Research UK, the University of Cambridge's medical school, and the United Kingdom's governmental Medical Research Council, which has National Institute for Health and Care Research-designated biomedical research centre status. Cambridge Biomedical Campus is an accredited UK academic health and science centre.

Constituent institutions
The Cambridge Biomedical Campus is home to the following institutions.

Cambridge University Hospitals NHS Foundation Trust

Addenbrooke's hospital

Addenbrooke's Hospital is a large teaching hospital, and the central focus of the campus.

Rosie maternity hospital

The Rosie Hospital is Cambridge's first purpose-built maternity hospital, opened in October 1983.  A multimillion-pound extension of the Rosie Hospital was completed in 2012.

Royal Papworth Hospital NHS Foundation Trust

The Royal Papworth Hospital moved to new premises on the Cambridge Biomedical Campus in Spring 2019.

AstraZeneca

AstraZeneca's global research and development facility is based on the campus and will house a workforce of approximately 2,000 individuals. It will be home to both early and late-stage medicines discovery and development, and cover both small molecules and biologics. Research activities will span all preclinical functional groups, including antibody engineering, medicinal chemistry and high throughput screening. Originally due for completion in 2016 at a budget of £330 million, by 2020 the company stated completion was expected by the end of 2021 at a budget of £1 billion.

University of Cambridge School of Clinical Medicine

The University of Cambridge Medical School, established in 1976.

MRC Laboratory of Molecular Biology

The LMB is a molecular biology research institute funded by the UK Medical Research Council. It was founded in Cambridge in 1947 as the Unit for Research on the Molecular Structure of Biological Systems and moved to a site adjacent to Addenbrooke's Hospital in 1962. A 27,000m2 replacement building close to the previous site was completed in 2012 and opened in May 2013.

The laboratory has won twelve Nobel Prizes including the 1962 prize (Physiology or Medicine) awarded for the discovery of the double-helix structure of DNA.

Wellcome Trust - Medical Research Council Cambridge Stem Cell Institute

The Wellcome Trust-Medical Research Council Cambridge Stem Cell Institute or 'SCI' is a virtual organisation composed of the Anne McLaren Laboratory for Stem Cell Biology and Regenerative Medicine and the Wellcome Trust Centre for Stem Cell Research, as well as University-based Principal Investigators working in neighbouring Cambridge institutes whose research is primarily focused on stem cell biology and/or translation.  The SCI is principally funded by the Wellcome Trust and the Medical Research Council.  The Wellcome Trust also funds the SCI's internationally competitive 4-Year PhD Programme in Stem Cell Biology and Medicine. Stem cell biology and regenerative medicine research is a designated University of Cambridge Strategic Initiative.

The aims of the SCI are:

To make fundamental discoveries that provide new insights into stem cell function and potency;
To understand the role of stem and progenitor cells in disease and thereby to improve diagnosis and treatment;
To harness the capacity of endogenous stem and progenitor cells for repair and regeneration;
To exploit stem cells as tools for studying the molecular pathogenesis of human diseases and discovery of therapeutic agents;
To nurture future generations of stem cell scientists and clinical investigators in an intellectually invigorating mix of basic and translational research.

The SCI was formed in 2012 following an £8m investment by the Wellcome Trust and the Medical Research Council.  The SCI will eventually be housed in a purpose-built 8000m2 facility to be constructed on the Cambridge Biomedical Campus site.

Cancer Research UK Cambridge Institute

The Cancer Research UK Cambridge Institute is  one of four core funded Cancer Research UK Institutes  and a department of the University of Cambridge. In 2018, the department received an annual budget of £45 million, £27.8 million of which came from Cancer Research UK. The institute offers highly competitive PhD programmes; both studentships and clinical research training fellowships (for aspiring clinical academics), attracting applicants from the UK and around the world.  Cancer research is a designated University of Cambridge Strategic Initiative.

Research in the Institute focuses primarily on Tumour Ecology and Evolution, with investigations across four main areas:

Basic research, which involves looking into the cellular and molecular biology of cancer.
Research into molecular imaging, genomics, bioinformatics and biomolecular modeling.
Research that focuses on specific cancer sites, forming a bridge between the clinical and laboratory areas.
Clinical investigations and trials, including population based studies into screening and prevention.

The centre was officially opened by Queen Elizabeth II in February 2007. In 2018, Professor Gregory Hannon was announced as the new Director, taking over from Professor Simon Tavaré.

Senior Group Leader at the institute, Professor Richard Gilbertson, is the Director of the Cancer Research UK Cambridge Centre, a network that encourages local collaborations between universities, NHS hospitals, and other research organisations.

Cambridge Institute for Medical Research

The CIMR is a cross-departmental institute in the University of Cambridge, receiving funding from the Wellcome Trust. Research is focused on four main areas: misfolded proteins and disease, intracellular membrane traffic, autoimmune disease and haematopoietic stem cell biology.

Wolfson Brain Imaging Centre

The Wolfson Brain Imaging Centre was created in 1995 to develop and apply advanced imaging methods to patients with traumatic brain injury.  It is unique in being co-located with the Neurosciences Critical Care Unit of Addenbrooke's Hospital.  Since its establishment it has become an internationally leading Positron Emission Tomography and Magnetic Resonance Imaging centre.

Hutchison/MRC Research Centre
The Hutchison/MRC Research Centre is a cancer research centre housing researchers from the University of Cambridge Department of Oncology, the MRC Cancer Cell Unit, and the University of Cambridge "Cambridge Molecular Therapeutics Programme".  It was built in 2001 with funding from the Medical Research Council and a donation to the University of Cambridge from Hutchison Whampoa Ltd. The Hutchison/MRC Research Centre is a member institute of the Cambridge Cancer Centre, a virtual organisation of Cambridge researchers whose work has current or potential application to cancer research.

MRC Mitochondrial Biology Unit

The MRC Mitochondrial Biology Unit is a department of the School of Clinical Medicine of the University of Cambridge, funded by the Medical Research Council. It is focused on research to understand mitochondrial process and their involvement in human diseases. It is co-located with the Cambridge Institute for Medical Research in the Wellcome Trust/MRC Building.

Institute of Metabolic Science
The Institute of Metabolic Science (IMS) is dedicated to research, education, prevention and clinical care in the areas of diabetes, obesity and related metabolic and endocrine diseases. The institute is a joint venture between the University of Cambridge, The Medical Research Council, Cambridge University NHS Hospitals Trust and the Wellcome Trust. It is led by co-directors Professor Sir Stephen O'Rahilly and Professor Nick Wareham. Lead researchers include Krishna Chatterjee, David Dunger, Sadaf Farooqi, Nita Forouhi, Stephen O’Rahilly, Nigel Unwin, Antonio Vidal-Puig, Nick Wareham, and Giles Yeo, among many others.

Brain Repair Centre
Adjacent to the Institute of Public Health, Cambridge Centre for Brain Repair is a subsidiary of the University of Cambridge Department of Clinical Neurosciences. It is a research institute aiming to "understand, and eventually to alleviate and repair damage to the brain and spinal cord which results from injury or neurodegenerative disease."

Institute for Public Health
The Institute for Public Health is a partnership between the University of Cambridge, the Medical Research Council and the National Health Service. It was created in 1993 to study disease in the population and to identify, evaluate and monitor public healthcare interventions.

Cambridge Academy for Science and Technology
The Cambridge Academy for Science and Technology is a secondary school for 14- to 18-year-olds offering GCSE, B-Tech and A-Level courses. It opened on 8 September 2014 in the Deakin Centre as the University Technical College Cambridge. On Friday 19 September 2017, it moved into its own building on Robinson Way, situated next to the Long Road Sixth Form College, parallel to the Bio-Medical Campus which encompasses Addenbrooke's Hospital, rebranded as Cambridge Academy for Science and Technology.

Other
Other entities located on the Cambridge Biomedical Campus include:
 Institute for Diabetes, Endocrinology and Metabolism
 GlaxoSmithKline Clinical Research Unit
 MRC Centre for Protein Engineering
 National Blood Service
 Strangeways Research Laboratory

Future developments
Within the next decade, there are scheduled to be 3 new hospitals (including one rebuild) on the Biomedical Campus, bringing the total number of hospitals on the Campus to 5:

 A rebuild of the existing Addenbrooke's Hospital (referred to as Addenbrooke's 3)
 Cambridge Cancer Research Hospital
 Cambridge Children's Hospital (referred to as Cambridge Children's)

A new railway station, Cambridge South railway station, is due to be built adjacent to the Campus, as part of the construction of the East West Rail project between the university towns of Cambridge and Oxford.

References

University of Cambridge sites